Franchomme may refer to:

Auguste Franchomme (1808–1884): Composer and cellist.
Hector Franchomme (1860–1939): Engineer from the École centrale de Lille, owner of the chocolate factory Delespaul-Havez where was invented Carambar.
 Pierre Franchomme: Aromatologist and pharmacologist, introduced the notion of chemotype in 1975.